Talmadge Layman "Marse" Hill (May 19, 1902 – March 8, 1982) was the head basketball coach and an assistant football coach at Morgan State College, from the 1930s to the 1960s.

Early life
Hill was born in  East Orange, New Jersey. He graduated from Morgan State College—now known as Morgan State University in 1928. Hill played college football for the Morgan State Bears.  In a game versus Lincoln, he was tackled by a player from Lincoln's bench as he was streaking down the sideline for the apparent winning touchdown. Morgan eventually was awarded the touchdown and won the game.  After his career at Morgan, Hill earned a master's degree at Columbia University and then returned to Morgan as a teacher and assistant coach in 1930. Hill was hired as a professor and taught biology.

Coaching career
Early in his coaching career at Morgan, Hill was the assistant to Edward P. Hurt in football, basketball and track.  He took over head coaching responsibilities for the basketball team in 1948 and served as the head coach until 1960. Hill was described as a conservative coach and one who did not like "fancy" ball handlers playing for him.

Late life and death
Hill retired from coaching in 1964 and was named professor emeritus of health and physical education in 1972.  He died on March 8, 1982, at Provident Hospital in Baltimore, after suffering a series of strokes.

Head coaching record

Awards and honors

 1969: named to the Maryland Commission on Physical Fitness
 1972: elected to the Morgan State University Athletic Hall of Fame
 1974: Morgan State University field house (pictured) named in his honor
 1975: inducted into The Pigskin Club Hall of Washington, D.C. Hall of Fame
 1978: inducted into the HBCU Hall of Fame
 Chairman of the Mid-Eastern Athletic Conference (MEAC) Steering and Planning Committee and the league's first president
 The MEAC men's all-sports award is named for Hill

References

External links
 

1902 births
1982 deaths
Morgan State Bears football coaches
Morgan State Bears football players
Morgan State Bears men's basketball coaches
Morgan State University faculty
College track and field coaches in the United States
Columbia University alumni
Sportspeople from East Orange, New Jersey
African-American coaches of American football
African-American players of American football
Basketball coaches from New Jersey
African-American basketball coaches
20th-century African-American sportspeople